François Hertel (31 May 1905 – 4 October 1985) was a Canadian writer. His work was part of the literature event in the art competition at the 1948 Summer Olympics.

References

1905 births
1985 deaths
20th-century Canadian male writers
Olympic competitors in art competitions
Writers from Quebec